Puskás Aréna is a football stadium in the 14th district (Zugló) of Budapest, Hungary. The stadium's construction started in 2017 and was finished before the end of 2019. It is an all-seater with a capacity of 67,215. The Hungarian Football Federation meets all UEFA and FIFA stadium requirements, and was awarded 4-stars by the UEFA. The stadium is built in the place of the former Ferenc Puskás Stadium whose demolition was completed in October 2016. Both stadiums were named in honour of the former national team captain Ferenc Puskás (1927–2006).

History
In 2011, when originally budgeted, the cost of the construction of the new stadium was put at 35 billion Hungarian forints.

On 26 June 2014, László Vigh said that the construction of the new stadium would cost 90-100 billion Hungarian forints.

On 1 August 2014, the Nemzeti Sport Központ (the National Sports Center) presented the final vision of Hungary's new national stadium. The Hungarian architect György Skardelli, who was the designer of the nearby indoor arena, László Papp Budapest Sports Arena showed his original plans that did not include the demolition of the original stadium

On 19 September 2014, UEFA selected Budapest to host three group stage games and one round of 16 game at UEFA Euro 2020.

On 19 September 2014, Sándor Csányi, the president of the Hungarian Football Federation, said that the fact that Budapest can host UEFA Euro 2020 is a big achievement of the Hungarian sport diplomacy.

On 23 February 2017, János Lázár, Minister of Prime Minister's Office of Hungary, said that the cost of the stadium will rise to 190 billion Hungarian forint from the previously estimated 100 billion. The current budget of 190 billion Hungarian forints (EUR 610 million) is well over 100% of the original cost estimates and is far more expensive than similarly sized stadiums in Europe such as Allianz Arena in Munich or Arsenal's Emirates Stadium.

In 2014, the original designs of the new Puskás Ferenc stadium was voted the best design by Stadiumdb.com which complimented the imaginative design which included an elevated running track that overlooked the pitch and had city skyline views. However, by the time of construction two attempts at cutting unnecessary elements from the project scaled back the design to being football-focused because of the huge inflation of the construction budget and the desire to build a new athletics stadium in Budapest by Hungarian Prime Minister Viktor Orbán for a future Summer Olympics bid.

On 29 June 2018, the Visitors' Centre of the Puskás Ferenc Stadium was opened. Balázs Fürjes, minister responsible for Budapest and its agglomeration, said at the opening of the centre that the new stadium would be more than a stadium. It would be a multi-purpose stadium that can hold concerts and conferences as well. He also said that preferably the stadium would host the 2021 UEFA Champions League Final.

On 14 December 2018, the Hungarian Association of Journalists (in Hungarian: Magyar Sportújságírók Szövetsége) and the members of the communication department of the Hungarian Football Federation visited the construction.

All of the seats were mounted by 2 October 2019.

Cashless catering system was installed in the new arena. In the arena only touch cards or NFC are accepted.

Only 500 parking spaces were created around the new stadium. Therefore, it is advisable to arrive at the arena by using public transport.

Opening
On 15 November 2019 the arena was opened by the match Hungary-Uruguay. The idea to invite the Uruguay national football team came from 
Károly Jankovics who is the leader of the Hungarian community in Montevideo.

All of the tickets were sold for the opening match against Uruguay. In the first three days only the members of the Supporters' Club of the Hungarian Football Federation could purchase the tickets.

Although the opening match was planned to be the last match of Zoltán Gera, he did not play at the opening match, as he said that his condition would not make it possible to play against Uruguay.

Uruguay won the game, 2–1.

Notable matches

Hungarian Cup finals

UEFA club matches

2020 UEFA Super Cup

2020–21 UEFA Champions League matches

2020–21 UEFA Europa League matches

2023 UEFA Europa League Final

UEFA Euro 2020 matches

Hungary national football team matches 

Note:
UEFA NL = UEFA Nations League
Q = Qualification
PO = Play-off
FIFA WC = FIFA World Cup

Statistics of Hungary national football team matches 

Top scorer:  Dominik Szoboszlai  (4 goals)

Concerts

Gallery

See also
Arena Națională
Stadion Narodowy
Ernst-Happel-Stadion
Olimpiyskiy
Luzhniki Stadium
Wembley Stadium

References

External links

Pictures and data at magyarfutball.hu 

Multi-purpose stadiums in Hungary
Sports venues in Budapest
Football venues in Hungary
Sports venues completed in 2019
2019 establishments in Hungary
UEFA Euro 2020 stadiums